Enemy of the System is the eighth studio album from the ska band The Toasters released in 2002. The album was the first Toasters release on Megalith Records; their long standing label Moon Ska Records became defunct in 2000. It was released 5 years after Don't Let the Bastards Grind You Down, due to the demise of ska label Moon Ska and, also, the decrease of third wave ska's mainstream popularity that saw the disappearance of a lot of ska bands some years before.

Track listing
 "Skafinger" – 2:44
 "Enemy of the System" – 3:03
 "Dog Eat Dog" – 4:19
 "Pirate Radio" – 3:52
 "Sweet Home Town Jamaica" – 4:12
 "Sitting on the Top of the World" – 3:07
 "Modern World America" (MP3) – 2:44
 "Why, Oh, Why?" – 4:23
 "Pendulum" – 3:04
 "Can I Get Another?" (MP3)  – 2:41
 "Barney" – 3:29
 "If You Loved Me" – 2:49
 "Road to Rio" – 2:53
 "Social Security" – 3:04

2002 albums
The Toasters albums